The Hammerschmiede clay pit (German: Tongrube Hammerschmiede) is a fossil bearing locality in Pforzen, Bavaria, Germany most well known for the discovery of Danuvius guggenmosi, the potentially earliest known bipedal ape. With an age of 11.66-11.42 Ma the site dates to the transition between the Middle and Late Miocene epoch, providing an important window into the faunal changes taking place during this time. This correlates to the time just after the Serravallian-Tortonian boundary, and the MN zones 7/8. It is one of the most well-known Miocene sites, with over 15,000 individual fossils and 117 species having been discovered as of 2020. It has been called "the most important German paleontological discovery of the last decades".

History 
Hammerschmiede's first fossils were first discovered by the hobby archaeologist Siegulf Guggenmos in 1972. The site became known in academic circles following publications on its rich fauna of micromammals in 1975. Since 2011, the excavations are led by a collaboration between the University of Tübingen and the Senckenberg Museum, and led by Madelaine Böhme, with the help of local volunteers. Excavations were intensified in 2015, following the discovery of a variety of scientifically significant finds. Media attention increased following the description of Danuvius guggenmosi in 2019, its name honoring the discoverer of the site. Nicknamed "Udo", the discovery was described as the oldest known example of an upright gape in Hominidae, with some media even going so far as to call it proof that the cradle of humanity was located in Bavaria. The site is threatened by clay mining.

Geography 
The Hammerschmiede clay pit is located within the eastern Allgäu region of Bavaria, within the municipality of Pforzen, at a height above sea level of almost 700 m. It is located just west of the district Hammerschmiede, after which it is named, and lies between the stream Riedgraben to its south, and the river Wertach to its East. Furthermore, the locality Irsee, where fossil plant remains had already been discovered in the 1950s, is located 4.3 km to its southwest. The closest town is Kaufbeuren to its south-east.

Geology and Stratigraphy 
The Hammerschmiede locality is part of the Upper Freshwater Molasse within the North Alpine foreland Basin. It is part of the Obere Serie, which includes Germany's youngest Molasse sediments. The 25.7 m thick section is best exposed at the southern end of the clay pit.

The horizontally bedded layers are mostly grey-colored, carbonatic and fine-grained silts, fine sands and claystone. The sedimentary succession can be traced over 150 m in a northern direction, with seven marker beds being traceable across the whole distance. These are three lignite horizons, three sand horizons and one marlstone. The circa 0.45 m thick homogeneous silty-clayey marlstone contains a variety of terrestrial gastropods, and is located in the basal part of the northern profile. Meanwhile, up to 10 mm thick pedogenic carbonate concretions are abundant in the upper 20 cm. A 20 cm thick blackish lignite horizon occurs 1.5 m above this horizon, overlaying 70 cm of yellowish and brownish mottled dark-grey clay. The color of this lignite is platy, it is partly xylitic and can be horizontally replaced by carbonatic peat clay. This succession may be viewed as a complete calcic paleosol, with the marlstone representing the Bk-horizon, the mottled clay the Bt-horizon, and the lignite the A-horizon. Three horizontally continuous bodies of fine-sand are located between the upper and lower lignite horizons, with the lower one being 1.05 m thick, greenish-grey, showing no bedding structures, but containing iron-hydroxide stains. The middle sand horizon, made up of mica rich grey-blue to greyish sand and containing iron-hydroxide stains, is 2.8 m thick at the southern part of the clay pit, and develops into an up to 4 m deep channel at its erosional base in the North. The upper sand horizon, consisting of grey silty fine-sand showing iron-hydroxide stains, is 1.4 m thick and is divided by a 20 cm thick pedogenic bed 0.70 m above its base. This bed, which includes small fossilised roots, consists of mottled clayey and sandy silts. Reworked pedogenic carbonates clay pebbles with a diameter of up to 3 cm occur 30 cm above the base of the horizon.

A 35 cm thick lignite horizon marks the top of the presently exposed sedimentary succession in the Hammerschmiede outcrop. Its basal 25 cm are platy colored and rarely contain xylit, while the upper 10 cm are blackish carbonatic organic clay instead of lignite. It overlays about 10 cm of carbonate-free, grey-greenish and rusty-yellowish mottled sandy and clayey slits. As a 40 cm thick rooted silt horizon, containing abundant powdery, whitish soft carbonate occurs below it, the topmost succession can be interpreted as an immature calcic paleosol.

Directly below this, another, shjallower calcic paleosol is developed. Its A-horizon is formed by 7 cm thick blackish carbonatic peat clay, overlaying the Bt-horizon (5 cm thick grey clay) and Bk-horizon (8 cm thick whitish clay horizon with abundant powdery carbonate). The paleosols rooting system reaches 50 cm below the A-horizon.

Furthermore, several truncated paleosols, which either completely or partly lack the A-horizon, occur especially between the two lower sand horizons. Those are characterized by up to 0.60 m thick grey green-yellowish mottled clayey marls, which contain matrix-supported pedogenic carbonate concretions. Two less developed calcic-paleosols, which are completely lacking A-horizons but clay-rich Btk horizons, make up the basal 4 meters of the succession in the southern profile.

The locality is divided into six stratigraphic layers.

 HAM 1, of an unclear age, but likely correlating with HAM 5.
 HAM 2, of an unclear age.
 HAM 3, is an erosional channel rich in lignitic pebbles near the top of the sequence, of an unclear age, although proposed to be younger than HAM 1.
 HAM 4 is made up of the trough cross stratified sands of the middle sand horizons channel, and has been dated to 11.44 Ma. Well-developed small-scale cross bedding structures and trough cross stratification can be found in the deepest parts, while reworked pedogenic carbonate concretions, pieces of wood and fossils of gastropods and vertebrates are found as channel lag. Its upper part shows well-preserved fossil roots, which can be traced to depths of 2.8 m.
 HAM 5 is the layer providing the most vertebrate fossils, and has been dated to 11.622–11.618 Ma. Its base is located at 681 m above sea level, and made up of 0.3 m grey, sandy marl containing the bivale Margaritifera flabellata and very abundant component-supported pedogenic carbonate concretion, with an average diameter of 10 mm. Above comes a 0.2 m layer of fine-to-medium grained sand, containing both bivalves and caliche pebbles. The following 0.15 m thick section is similar to the basal horizon, although the component-supported pedogenic carbonate concretion are much smaller on average, usually with a diameter of only 1 mm. A trough-shaped fine-to-medium grained sand body, containing well-rounded quartz pebbles with a diameter of up to 35 mm, as well as marble pebbles. Above 0.2 m of green-grey silty clay occurs. This layer contains remains of gastropods and bivalves, flaser bedded finesand laminae, a low number of pedogenic carbonate concretions and very few quartz pebbles. One meter of thick greenish sandy clay to silkish fine sand overlay the 0.85 m thick sand layer. Molluscs are common here, although badly preserved because of partial leaching of their carbonate shells.
 HAM 6, which has been entirely mined down, but based on available information it is likely that it had a lens-like structure, was dominated by proboscidean remains and situated slightly above HAM 4, just below the topmost coal layer. Therefore, its age has been calculated at 11.42 Ma.

Paleoenvironment 
The environment of Hammerschmiede was a seasonally dry floodplain of meandering rivers and streams flowing from south to north. HAM 5 represents a rivulet of local origin, with a width of four to five meters, a channel fill thickness of 0.8–1 meter and a mean water depth of ≤ 0.8 m. HAM 4 was a medium-sized river, with a width of roughly 50 m, a channel fill thickness of 4–5 m and a mean water depth of ≤ 4 m. Both channels are asymmetric in cross-section, with a more deeply incised outer bank and a shallower slip-off slope. Based on grain sizes, the flow velocity of both channels has been estimated as low to very low. However, the presence of an autochthonous freshwater mollusc fauna made up out of Pisidium, Margaritifera, Sphaerium and Bithynia suggests well-oxygenated waters, with moderate flow. The presence of considerable amounts of water are furthermore supported by the abundance of fish and turtle fossils, as well as swamp plants. Pebbles of alpine origin are not present, but reworked marine plankton from the Upper Marine Molasse is. Therefore, the catchment area of these rivers did not include alpine areas. Instead, they likely had their source in the Faltenmolasse just a few kilometers south of Hammerschmiede.

The paleoclimate of the locality was subtropical and considerably warmer and drier than that of the region today,⁣ with annual average temperatures of perhaps over 20 °C. Estimates based on the herpetofauna suggest mean annual precipitation (MAP) of 974 ± 256 mm for HAM 1, 1008 ± 257 mm for HAM 2 and 1196 ± 263 mm for HAM 3, while a MAP of 858 ± 147 mm has been estimated for the calcic paleosol with an estimated age of 11.64 ma. Another study estimates mean warm month temperatures of 24.7-27.9 °C, warm month precipitation of 79–172 mm and an average Köppen Aridity Index of 25.4.

All this suggests a seasonally dry climate, with swamps developing in the riparian regions during wetter periods. The high temperatures and comparatively low precipitations suggest a significant seasonal water stress, which is furthermore supported by the abundant pedogenic carbonate concretions, indications of forest fires and an as of yet unpublished stable isotope analysis, which showcases the enriched δ13C values of a C3 vegetation under very strong water stress. The large number of scansorial species suggests that the site was forested.

Biostratigraphy and Paleoecology 
Hammerschmiede dates to the latest stages of MN7/8, overlapping with the Astaracian-Vallesian boundary. Notable is the presence of Kretzoiarctos beatrix and Sinohippus sp., which link it with the slightly older locality Nombrevilla 2. Another taxon connecting Hammerschmiede to this Spanish locality is Galerix cf. exilis, thought to have gone extinct in Central Europe during earlier in the Middle Miocene, which likely reemmigrated from the Iberian peninsula to Germany during this time. Species such as these suggest that Hammerschmiede, and contemporary sites, may represent the last European faunas with Middle Miocene character. In slightly younger deposits, for example those correlating to the Mytilopsis ornitopsis zone (11.5 to 11.4 Ma, Vienna Basin) many lineages of large middle Miocene mammals have already been replaced with new immigrants, such as Hipparionine horses which define the MN9 zone. However, more typical Late Miocene taxa such as the large bovid Miotragocerus and the cricetid Microtocricetus molassicus are also present. Indeed, the occurrence of this cricetid originally led researchers to the conclusion that Hammerschmiede should be dated to MN9. Furthermore, Hammerschmiede shows both the first and last occurrences of a number of taxa, such as Eomellivora and Laphyctis, respectively.

The carnivoran assemblage of Hammerschmiede is the third richest known from Miocene Europe, with 28 different species. 13 sympatric small carnivorans are known from HAM 5 alone, a diversity comparable with the African tropics. The comparison with six other fossil assemblages (Sansan, Steinheim, La Grive-Saint Alban, Rudabánya, Can Ponsic and Can Llobateres 1) shows some marked differences between the carnivoran guild of those sites and Hammerschmiede. Amphicyonids, which are extremely common at the other localities, and barbourofelids, which are a regular presence, are only known from infrequent and fragmentary material at Hammerschmiede. Herpestids and lophocyonids, which are known from Sansan and La Grive, are completely absent, while Potamotherium and phocids are not known from the other localities.
Mustelids are the most diverse family, with 11 species, making up 39% of all Carnivora present at the locality. Viverrids are only presented by 3 species (11%), but make up 21% of all individuals found. However, there is a marked difference between their abundance in HAM 4 (36%) and HAM 5 (4%). HAM 4 generally shows a lower diversity of large, scansorial and hypercarnivorous carnivorans in comparison with HAM 5, although the number of semiaquatic species is much higher with four. Notably, it is the only locality in which Lartetictis and Paralutra are known to have coexisted, despite the suggestion that the latter genus gradually replaced the former. Other likely competitors include Viverrictis-Circamustela and Semigenetta sansaniensis-"Martes" sansaniensis. Larger species with overlapping ecological roles include the metailurine and barbourofelid. The latters shows more derived sabertooth features, suggesting it likely preyed on larger animals than the felid, which probably attacked medium-sized prey from trees. The coexistence of all these competing taxa can be explained by the existence of significant resources.

Paleofauna

Arthropoda

Molluscs

Bivalvia

Gastropoda

Fish

Amphibia

Anura

Urodela

Reptiles

Choristodera

Testudines

Squamata

Aves

Mammalia

Artiodactyla

Carnivora

Caniforma

Feliforma

Chiroptera

Eulipotyphla

Lagomorpha

Primates

Perissodactyla

Proboscidea

Rodentia

Paleoflora

References 

Quarries in Germany
Miocene paleontological sites
Paleoanthropological sites